Baldwin is an unincorporated community located in Madison County, Kentucky, United States. Its post office  is closed. It is located at the west end of Kentucky Route 1985

References

Unincorporated communities in Madison County, Kentucky
Unincorporated communities in Kentucky